Sylvia Young Theatre School is an independent school in Marble Arch, London, England. It is a specialist performing arts school named after its founder and principal, Sylvia Young OBE.

Outline
The Sylvia Young Theatre School was founded in 1972 with part-time classes in East London. It was established as a full-time school in 1981 on Drury Lane, but due to expansion it moved to Rossmore Road, Marylebone in 1983. The school moved premises once again in 2010 to a converted church in Nutford Place, Westminster.

Students either attend the full-time school (students aged 10 to 16 years), the part-time school on Thursday evenings or Saturdays (students aged 4 to 18 years) or holiday schools (students aged 7 to 18 years). Tuition fees (as of 2022) are £15,000 per annum for day pupils, £25,000–30,000 per annum for boarding pupils. (Day pupils outnumber boarding pupils by a factor of five to one.)

Students from the Sylvia Young Theatre School have appeared in television, film and theatre productions, including main roles in EastEnders,  Merry Christmas, Mr. Bean, Matilda, Billy Elliott, The Lion King, The Bodyguard, Les Misérables, and Charlie & The Chocolate Factory.

The school has been described as "Eton for the Pop Idol generation" and is renowned for producing soap stars, pop stars and TV personalities.

Notable alumni
Performers who attended the Sylvia Young Theatre School include:

Adam Woodyatt
Adele Silva
Adrianna Bertola
Alex Pettyfer
Alex Walkinshaw
Amy Winehouse
Anna Fantastic
Archie Lyndhurst
Ashley Horne
Ashley Walters
Bessie Cursons
Bethan Wright
Billie Piper
Camilla Power
Ceallach Spellman
Charlotte Spencer
Clare Buckfield
Clare Burt
Dani Behr
Danielle McCormack
Danniella Westbrook
Dean Gaffney
Denise Van Outen
Desmond Askew
Dionne Bromfield
District3 
Dominique Moore 
Dua Lipa
Ella Purnell
Emma Bunton
Fern Deacon
Frances Ruffelle
Gemma Collins
Giovanna Fletcher
Hollie Chapman
Iain Robertson
Isabel Hodgins
Isabella Pappas
Jake Roche
Jade Ewen
Jade Alleyne
James Lance
Jamie Borthwick
Jasmine Thompson
Javine Hylton
Jaymi Hensley 
Jemima Rooper
Jenna Russell
Jesy Nelson
Jodi Albert
John Pickard
Jon Lee
John McCrea
Joseph Kpobie
Josh Cuthbert 
Kara Tointon
Keeley Hawes
Kellie Bright
Laura Evans
Laura Sadler
Lauren Platt
Layton Williams
Leigh-Anne Pinnock
Leona Lewis
Letitia Dean
Lily Cole
Louisa Lytton
Lucinda Dryzek
Luisa Bradshaw-White
Matt Di Angelo
Matt Willis
Matthew James Thomas
Melanie Blatt
Mimi Slinger
Mohammed George
Molly Rainford
Natalie Appleton
Nathan Sykes
Nicholas Hoult
Nick Berry
Nick Pickard
Nicola Stapleton
Nicole Appleton
Perry Fenwick
Preeya Kalidas
Reni Eddo-Lodge
Rita Ora
Sam Callahan
Samantha Womack
Sapphire Elia
Sarah Harrison
Scott Robinson
Sean Borg
Shannon Arrum Williams
Sheree Murphy
Sophie Lawrence
Stefan Abingdon
 Stella Quaresma
Steven Mackintosh
Sydney Rae White
Tamzin Outhwaite
Tom Fletcher
Vanessa White

References

External links
 

 
1981 establishments in England
Dance schools in the United Kingdom
Drama schools in London
Educational institutions established in 1981
Private co-educational schools in London
Private schools in the City of Westminster
Member schools of the Independent Schools Association (UK)
Schools of the performing arts in the United Kingdom